By Appointment Only is a 1933 American pre-Code film directed by Frank R. Strayer.

Successful doctor Michael Travers (Lew Cody) juggles a busy schedule of patients, one of whom is the mother of 14-year-old Judy (Sally O'Neil). After Judy's mother dies, Travers and his fiancé, Diane Manners (Aileen Pringle), take responsibility for Judy's care. Upon returning from a three-year trip to Europe, Travers finds himself falling in love with Judy, despite her engagement to Diane's younger brother, Dick. Tensions rise as the four become aware of each other's feelings. Travers finally realizes how things must be, and the film ends with the marriage of Judy and Dick.

Cast
Lew Cody as Dr. Michael Travers
Aileen Pringle as Diane Manners
Sally O'Neil as Judy Carroll
Edward Morgan as Richard "Dick" Manners
Edward Martindel as Judge Barry Phelps
Wilson Benge as Withers, the Butler
Marceline Day as Miss Brown aka Brownie
Claire McDowell as Mrs. Mary Carroll
Pauline Garon as Gwen Reid
Gladys Blake as Helen, Switchboard Operator

References

External links

1933 films
1933 drama films
1930s English-language films
American black-and-white films
Films directed by Frank R. Strayer
American drama films
Chesterfield Pictures films
1930s American films